Volosianka is a village (selo) in Stryi Raion, Lviv Oblast, of  Western Ukraine. It is located in the Ukrainian Carpathians, within the limits of the Eastern Beskids. Volosianka belongs to Slavske settlement hromada, one of the hromadas of Ukraine. The population of village is 1452 persons. Local government – Volosiankivska village council. Volosiankivska village council includes village Khashchovania and Yalynkuvate.

The first written mention of Volosianka which dates from 1572. 

Until 18 July 2020, Volosianka belonged to Skole Raion. The raion was abolished in July 2020 as part of the administrative reform of Ukraine, which reduced the number of raions of Lviv Oblast to seven. The area of Skole Raion was merged into Stryi Raion.

Geography 
Village are located in the valley of  the rivers Slavka River and Yalynkuvata River.
West of the village are the vertices Vysokyy Verh, Plischka, Mount Yarochysche and Mount Yalyna. In the south is Mount Ilsa.

Attractions 
In this village there are an architectural monument of national importance. That is the wooden Church of the Holy Eucharist  and a belfry.

References

External links 
   natural attractions
 weather.in.ua
 Волосянка. Церква Пресвятої Євхаристії 
 Волосянківська сільська рада 
 Населенні пункти Сколівського району  -  Волосянка 
  Туризм и отдых в Украине. Достопримечательности Украины (Церковь Преображення Господнего (Церковь Пресвятой Евхаристии)) 

Villages in Stryi Raion